Dans Mountain is located in Allegany County, Maryland, USA between Georges Creek and the North Branch Potomac River. Although there are higher points in Maryland, Dans Mountain has the most impressive escarpment of Maryland's mountains. It is essentially continuous with the longer escarpment that continues both north (into Pennsylvania) and south (into West Virginia) known as the Allegheny Front.
 
Dan's Rock Overlook is the highest scenic overlook in the park. The park also features a pond that is stocked annually, an Olympic-sized pool with a modern bathhouse, and concession stands.

Dans Mountain is named for Daniel Cresap, the son of Thomas Cresap and one of the first settlers in Allegany County. Cresap was known for being adventurous, often hunting with a Delaware Indian named Nemacolin. While pursuing a bear in a tree, Daniel fell and lay unconscious until Nemacolin found him, and dragged Daniel home to safety. Since that event, the mountain has been known as Dans Mountain.

Dan's Mountain Wildlife Management Area protects the mountain in an area covering 9,504 acres.

References

External links
 
 
 

Landforms of Allegany County, Maryland
Mountains of Maryland
Allegheny Mountains